Dakota Mamola (born 21 October 1994 in Barcelona) is a Belgian motorcycle racer. He races in the MotoAmerica Superstock 600 Championship aboard a Yamaha YZF-R6. Son of an American father—the former motorcycle racer Randy Mamola—and a Belgian mother, he has competed either with a Spanish and a Belgian racing license. In 2014 he made his debut in the Moto2 World Championship under the Belgian flag, as he replaced Nicolás Terol for the British Grand Prix.

Career statistics

Grand Prix motorcycle racing

By season

Races by year

References

External links

1994 births
Living people
Belgian motorcycle racers
Moto2 World Championship riders
Sportspeople from Barcelona